Harlow South Orton (November 23, 1817July 4, 1895) was an American lawyer and judge.  He was the 8th Chief Justice of the Wisconsin Supreme Court, and served on the court from 1878 until his death.  He is chiefly remembered as the author of the Wisconsin Supreme Court opinion Vosburg v. Putney (1890), an important torts case in establishing the scope of liability from battery.  Earlier in his career, he served three non-consecutive terms in the Wisconsin State Assembly, representing Madison and central Dane County.

Background 
Orton was born in Niagara County, New York, on November 23, 1817, and educated at the Hamilton Academy and then at Madison University (which later changed its name to Colgate University).  In 1837, Orton moved to Kentucky, where he spent a year as a school teacher, before joining his brother Myron, who was a lawyer, in Indiana.  Harlow Orton was called to the bar in 1838.  Orton practiced law for five years.  In 1843, Indiana Governor Samuel Bigger (a Whig) appointed Orton circuit judge for Porter County, Indiana.

Orton served as an Indiana judge for four years.  In 1847, he moved to Milwaukee, in the Wisconsin Territory, and again set himself up as a private lawyer.  In 1852, Orton moved to Madison, Wisconsin to serve as legal counsel and private secretary for Whig Governor of Wisconsin Leonard J. Farwell.

Assembly service and 1855 election 
He was elected as a Whig member of the Wisconsin State Assembly from Dane County's 5th Assembly district (the then-Village of Madison, and the Towns of Town of Madison, Blooming Grove, "Burk" [sic], Westport, Vienna, and Windsor) in 1853, succeeding Democrat Mathew Roche. He was succeeded by Democrat William R. Taylor.

In the 1855 Wisconsin gubernatorial election, in the official canvass, Republican Coles Bashford was narrowly defeated by Democrat William A. Barstow.  Bashford sued, however, alleging fraudulent election returns, and was ultimately successful in having the Wisconsin Supreme Court declare him the winner of the election.  Orton was Bashford's lawyer in this proceeding.

In 1858, Orton was again elected to the Assembly, succeeding Democrat Frank Gault in a 5th District which now included the Towns of Dane, Vienna, Westport, Springfield, Middleton, and Madison (but only the 1st Ward of the City of Madison), and described his profession as "Capt. of the Dane Cavalry"; he was assigned to the standing committees on the judiciary and the militia. In 1859, Orton was appointed judge for the 9th Judicial Circuit to fill the vacancy left by Luther S. Dixon, who became a Wisconsin Supreme Court justice. (Orton was succeeded in the Assembly by Republican Leonard Farwell.) Orton resigned as circuit judge in 1865 and returned to private law practice.

U.W. Law School and elected offices 
Orton served as dean of the University of Wisconsin Law School from 1869 to 1874. He was elected a final time to the Assembly in 1870, this time unopposed, as one of several "people's" candidates; he described himself as "a conservative democrat, or democratic-whig, or independent, [who] believes in a strong government of the people". (Democratic incumbent Alden Sanborn was not running for re-election.) He was succeeded in 1871 (the Assembly having been redistricted in the meantime) by Democrat John D. Gurnee. Orton ran for Congress in 1876 as a Democrat, against Republican incumbent Lucien B. Caswell, but lost by 348 votes (0.55% of the vote); and served one term as mayor of Madison in 1877.

Supreme Court 
In 1877, Wisconsin amended its constitution to create two more seats on the Supreme Court and Orton was elected. Orton became the chief justice when Chief Justice William Lyon retired in 1894.

Orton was on the Supreme Court until he died July 4, 1895. He and his wife Elizabeth Cheney had four children.

External links
New York Times Obituary
Biography at the Wisconsin Supreme Court
 

|-

|-

1817 births
1895 deaths
People from Niagara County, New York
People from Porter County, Indiana
Indiana state court judges
Mayors of Madison, Wisconsin
Wisconsin state court judges
Members of the Wisconsin State Assembly
Chief Justices of the Wisconsin Supreme Court
Wisconsin Whigs
19th-century American politicians
Wisconsin Democrats
University of Wisconsin Law School faculty
19th-century American judges